Helwig is a German surname. Notable people with the surname include:

Andreas Helwig (1572–1643), German classical scholar and linguist
David Helwig (born 1938), Canadian poet
Hans Helwig (1881–1952), German Nazi SS concentration camp commandant
John Helwig (1927–1994), American football player
Maggie Helwig (born 1961), Canadian poet
Martin Helwig (1516–1574), German cartographer from Silesia
Paul Helwig (1893–1963), German stage-manager, script-writer, philosopher and psychologist

See also
Alexander Helwig Wyant (1836–1892), American painter
Helvig (disambiguation)
Hellwig

German-language surnames